René Le Senne (born Ernest René Lesenne; 8 July 1882, in Elbeuf – 1 October 1954, in Neuilly-sur-Seine) was a French idealist philosopher and psychologist.

Publications 
 Obstacle et valeur, Paris, F. Aubier 1934
 La découverte de Dieu, Paris, Aubier, 1955
 Traité de morale générale, Paris, Puf, 1942
 Le devoir, Paris, Alcan, 1930
 Traité de caractérologie, Paris, Puf, 1945
 Introduction à la philosophie, Paris, Puf, 1949
 Le mensonge et le caractère, Paris, F. Alcan, 1930
 La destinée personnelle, Paris, Flammarion, Bibliothèque de philosophie scientifique, 1951

Articles
 La découverte de Dieu, recueil d'articles posthumes, 1955
 Le devoir comme principe de toute valeur, Bulletin de la Société française de philosophie, 1932
 Qu'est-ce que la valeur ?, Bulletin de la Société française de philosophie 1946.

English Translation
 Obstacle and Value, Northwestern University Studies in Phenomenology & Existential Philosophy, 1972

References 

1882 births
1954 deaths
Burials at Père Lachaise Cemetery
École Normale Supérieure alumni
French psychologists
French spiritualists
Writers from Rouen
20th-century psychologists